Thunderbird Resorts (Philippines), or Thunderbirds Resort-Hotel, is a five-star hotel-resort facing the South China Sea in Northern Luzon, Philippines. It is owned by an international property developer, anchored by casino and providing hospitality services in Asia and Latin America. It has other branches in Costa Rica, India, Nicaragua and Peru. It is located at VOA, Pennsylvania Avenue, Poro Point Special Economic and Freeport Zone, San Fernando, La Union, facing the Lighthouse beside Wallace Air Station, a United States Air Force (USAF) facility located in the Philippines.

The luxury resort is headed by an independent board of directors led by director, Roberto de Ocampo. The Resort is managed by Peter LeSar, the interim president and CEO, chief financial officer).

The resort is surrounded by the Thunderbird Residences that were inaugurated in October 2010. A model unit, Athena is one of the 10 beach homes/villas (under a rental contract) facing the main lobby of the hotel. Chloe, Selene, Alexa and Aphrodite homes are also in the Resort, which has 80 lots (within 15 hectares).

The resort overlooks the edge of a headland into the South China Sea.

The amenities include: Deluxe Garden Room, Deluxe Balcony Room and Deluxe VO Room, Olives restaurant, Patio Santorini coffee shop, Vegas Cafe, Pool Bar, Santorini Bar & Lounge, Swimming Pool and Cliffs Golf & Beach Club. The luxury suites are nestled upon a 100-foot cliff at the highest point of the Poro peninsula. A ₱200 million condotel will be erected in the prime property.

Image gallery

See also
Economy of the Philippines

References

External links
PPMC - Poro Point Management Corporation, Poro Point
Coordinates
Thunderbirdresorts
Website of the Resort
Resort and Hotel
San Fernando City Website

Hotels in the Philippines
Resorts in the Philippines
Beaches of the Philippines
Buildings and structures in San Fernando, La Union
Casinos in the Philippines
Tourist attractions in La Union